Norayr Mnatsakanyan (January 7, 1923 – March 25, 1986) was a Merited Artist of the Armenian Soviet Socialist Republic (1965).

As a renowned vocal performer of Armenian traditional and gusans' music, Norayr Mnatsakanyan has become one of the most influential vocalists in the canon of Armenian national music. Owing to his dainty baritone, profound knowledge of Armenian folk music, and his mastery of the Armenian language and Armenian literature, Norayr Mnatsakanyan has been highly acclaimed among famous writers, musicologists, and Armenian folk music lovers.

Norayr Mnatsakanyan was the first among Armenian vocalists to introduce a new approach to popular songs, as well as to the musical compilations of historic and contemporary gusans (Armenian minstrels). As an accepted convention of any national folklore, the works of Armenian popular and gusans music were performed in a crude, rustic, and provincial fashion. Professional performers of the opera and classical music also tried to render these works. However, their efforts to perform them alienated these works altogether from ordinary Armenian people, since the true significance of Armenian popular music could not have been properly represented by the artificially elitist operatic genre in Soviet Armenia. With his poetic approach to these great masterpieces of Armenian traditional and gusans' music, Norayr Mnatsakanyan was the first vocalist to present them in a refined and natural fashion, granting them an unprecedented simplistic register of artistic sophistication. Unlike his predecessors, Mnatsakanyan attempted to convey these works with a deep sense of harmony and in a previously impregnable unison with the authors' characteristic mentality and sentiments reflected in their compilations.

At the same time, Norayr Mnatsakanyan meticulously pursued to eliminate the provincial character of the songs that had wandered among the Armenian people for centuries. Thus, Norayr Mnatsakanyan's performances are exceptional because they masterfully immerse into the poetic essence of the literary work and unify it with the melody of the song. Norayr Mnatsakanyan also performed songs by famous Armenian composers interwoven with lyrics by such famous Armenian poets, as Avetik Isahakian, Vahan Terian, Hovhannes Shiraz. Perhaps the greatest Armenian lyricist - Avetik Isahakian - highly valued Mnatsakanyan's contributions to the canon of Armenian performing arts and proclaimed Norayr "the velvety voice" of Armenia. Derenik Demirchian marvelled at Norayr's performances in the poetic circles of the old Yerevan, calling Norayr Mnatsakanyan "a unique vocal interpreter of the popular consciousness, scattered bits of which are present in every Armenian individual." Being an art critic himself, Mnatsakanyan always conveyed great significance to the unity of the melody and the lyrics in whatever he performed.

Biography 
Norayr Mnatsakanyan was born on January 7, 1923, in an old Yerevan family. He inherited the love for traditional music from his parents. Possessing an ever singing spirit of a talented youth, Norayr Mnatsakanyan won his first prize at the young performers' competition held in Moscow in 1936. Owing to his extraordinary vocal qualities and his passion for acting, Mnatsakanyan started his career as actor and singer at the Yerevan State Theater of Musical Comedy after Hakob Paronian. As surprising as it may seem, Mnatsakanyan played the first Gikor on the Armenian stage in the namesake performance based on Hovhannes Tumanyan's famous . Mnatsakanyan's artistic talent and his reverence for the Theater drove him to work with such eminent theatrical stage directors as Armen Gulakian. Mnatsakanyan also had the honor of working with the "titans" of the Armenian theatrical arts at the Yerevan State Academic Theater after Gabriel Sundukian: Vahram Papazian, Hrachia Nersisyan, Avet Avetisyan, Hambardzum Khachanyan, Babken Nersisyan, Metaksia Simonyan, the late Mher Mkrtchyan, and Khoren Abrahamyan. Norayr Mnatsakanyan's acting, apart from his artistic talent, vouched for his unsurpassed mastery of World Literature. After seeing Mnatsakanyan's rehearsal in the role of the Shakespearean Othello, Vahram Papazian highly praised Norayr for his excellent rendition of Othello's protagonistic pathos and antagonistic callousness, and foresaw a bright future for him in acting. Mnatsakanyan later played one of the leading roles in A Man from Olympus (Chelovek iz Olimpa)(Armenfilm, 1974).

Purporting to pursue a more worldly profession, Norayr Mnatsakanyan held a Master of Arts degree from the Department of Philology of the Yerevan State University. Upon his graduation, Mnatsakanyan defended a dissertation with a thesis on "Sayat Nova's Lyric Poetry in the Armenian Literary Milieux." Mnatsakanyan proceeded with a professional career as a journalist and a freelance writer. With his unconventional disposition, Norayr Mnatsakanyan authored an anthology of short novels dedicated to the old city of Yerevan, depicting its people's way of life, its customs and traditions. As a journalist, Mnatsakanyan's articles and critiques on various issues of the Armenian arts and culture frequented the pages of many Armenian periodicals. One of Mnatsakanyan's most groundbreaking articles was dedicated to the famous Armenian duduk players of the past and the present: Margar Margarian, Levon Madoyan, Vatche Housepian, and Djivan Gasparyan. Mnatsakanyan also hosted a special program in 1985, the heyday of his artistic career, on the Public Television of Armenia, which was about the instrumental and stylistic distinctions of the duduk and its most outstanding players.

In spite of his success in acting and his excellence in writing, Mnatsakanyan's innate predilection belonged to singing. Norayr's art of performance, his truly rich and mellow voice, as well as his unique professional approach had already made him long sought-for to Armenian music lovers both in Armenia and abroad.  Subsequently, Norayr Mnatsakanyan became the ultimate crooner of Armenian performing arts after Tatoul Altunian, one of the greatest contributors to Armenian folk music, invited him to the State Philharmonic Chapel's Ensemble of Song and Dance to perform as a soloist. Here, Mnatsakanyan had the pleasure of working with Araksia Gyulzadian and Varduhi Khachatrian. Apart from his Sayat Nova repertoire, in this period, Norayr Mnatsakanyan performed popular songs and  works by such famous gusans (minstrels) as: Sheram, Ashot, Jivani, Havasi, as well as famous compilations of the urban folklore.

However, the inviolable right of Norayr Mnatsakanyan's achievement consists in his performances of Sayat Nova's works. His performances of Sayat Nova imbued the Bard's poetry with unprecedented lyricism and spirituality. It is through Norayr Mnatsakanyan's rendition of Sayat Nova that the ethical and metaphysical peculiarities in the works become apparent. The singer grieves and rejoices with the poet, feeling every tremble of the great Bard's heart. It is Norayr Mnatsakanyan's unforgettable voice that brings us the songs of Sayat Nova in the namesake movie (1960).

Mnatsakanyan's performances became a lot more accessible to the general public, when Aram Merangulian invited Norayr to perform as a soloist in his Ensemble of Folk Instruments of the Armenian National Radio and Television. Mnatsakanyan's songs are possible to find in several Armenian films, including Sergei Parajanov's The Color of Pomegranates 
(1969), also dedicated to the life of Sayat Nova. A piece of Mnatsakanyan's unique rendition of the traditional Dle Yaman also appears in the background of Andrew Goldberg's The Armenian Americans (2000). A number of documentaries were shot on Mnatsakanyan's life and activity intermitted by his own performances. Throughout his lifetime, the vocalist recorded over two hundred traditional and gusans songs, all of which are held as relics by the Museum Fund of the Public Radio and Television of Armenia. His performances have paved the way for many successors in the traditional vocal genre.

Norayr Mnatsakanyan performed in many countries where Armenians had set foot and had established their communities. During his tour of the Middle Eastern countries, Norayr Mnatsakanyan received an honorary gold medal from King Hussein of Jordan after his concert in Amman (1979), which His Majesty attended with Queen Noor. Mnatsakanyan's performance of Sayat Nova brought him the highest honors at the Festival of Traditional Music in Lyon, France (1981). Subsequently, upon the request of the smaller Armenian communities in Luxembourg, Belgium, and the Netherlands, Mnatsakanyan performed in a tributary concert at the Conservatoire de Luxembourg Hall (1981).

In the annual ceremony of the Armenian Music Awards, held in Los Angeles for the year 1999, Mnatsakanyan posthumously received a lifetime achievement award for his worthwhile contributions to Armenian music, and his album of traditional and gusans' compilations, named Husher (Reminiscences) (Parseghian Records, 1999) was recognized as the year's best traditional album.

In 2005, Narek Productions, with the support of the Public Radio of Armenia, launched a record, called "I Sing a Song," composed of Norayr Mnatsakanyan's performances of the most famous Armenian gusans' works.

References

Further information 
 Armenian Radio Archive - Norayr Mnatsakanyan
 AV Production - An Online Encyclopedia of Armenian Culture
 "Norayr Mnatsakanyan: the Velvety Voice of Armenia" ("Yerevan" Studios, 1983)
 "Canticle of Canticles," AMPTV, 2014
 "After Nahapet Hayk," AMPTV, 2007
  "Confession," Armenian Public Radio, 2011
 «Sayat Nova» (Armenfilm, 1960)
 Select Performances

Honored artists of Armenia
1923 births
1986 deaths
20th-century Armenian male singers
Armenian folk singers
Yerevan State University alumni
Musicians from Yerevan
Soviet male singers